A Misunderstood Boy is a 1913 American short drama film directed by D. W. Griffith.

Cast
 Lionel Barrymore as The Father
 Kate Bruce as The Mother
 Lillian Gish as The Daughter
 Robert Harron as The Son
 Alfred Paget as The Vigilante Leader
 Charles Hill Mailes as A Thieving Merchant
 Viola Barry as A Thieving Merchant
 Christy Cabanne as On Street
 William A. Carroll as Vigilante
 Joseph McDermott as Vigilante
 Antonio Moreno as Vigilante
 Frank Opperman as In Next Town
 W.C. Robinson as Vigilante

See also
 D. W. Griffith filmography
 Lillian Gish filmography
 Lionel Barrymore filmography

References

External links

1913 films
1913 short films
1913 drama films
Silent American drama films
American silent short films
Films directed by D. W. Griffith
American black-and-white films
1910s American films